The following is a list of Kurdish poets and authors:

9th century 

Balool

10th-15th century 

 Evdilsemedê Babek (972–1019)
 Ali Hariri (1009–1079/80)

 Mele Perîşan (1356–1431)
 Mela Huseynê Bateyî (1417–1495)

16th century 
Sherefxan Bidlisi (1543–1599)
Şêx Şemsedînê Exlatî (1558–1674)
Melayê Cizîrî (1570–1640) 
Asenath Barzani (1590–1670) 
Feqiyê Teyran (1590–1660)
Yusuf Yaska (1592–1636)
Elî Teremaxî

17th century
Mistefa Bêsaranî (1642–1701)

Ahmad Khani (1651–1707)
Shaykh Mustafa Takhtayi

18th century
Khana Qubadi (1700–1759), classic poet from southeastern Kurdistan, Iran.
Almas Khan-e Kanoule'ei (1706-1777), classic poet and author of Kurdish Shahnameh.
Marif Nodeyi (1753–1838/9)
Xelîlê Sêrtî (1754–1843)
Khulam Rada Khan Arkawazi (1765-1834), classic poet and ascetic from southeastern Kurdistan, Iran.
Khâlid-i Shahrazuri (1779–1827)
Şeyda Hewramî (1784–1852)
Mahmud Bayazidi (1797–1859)
Nalî (1797/1800–1855/6)
Yaqub Maydashti (1799–1871), classic poet from southeastern Kurdistan, Iran.

19th century
Mastoura Ardalan (1805–1848), poet and historiographer.
Mawlawi Tawagozi (1806–1882),  poet and sufi.
Haji Qadir Koyi (1817–1897), poet.
Mahwi (1830–1906), poet and sufi.
Sheikh Rezza Talabani (1835–1910), Iraq.
Wafaei (1844–1902) poet, Iran.

Edeb (1860–1918), poet, Iran

20th century
Piramerd (1867–1950), poet, writer, novelist and journalist, Iraqi Kurdistan.
Muhamed Amin Zaki (1880–1948), writer, historian and politician, Iraqi Kurdistan.
Taufiq Wahby (1891–1984), writer and linguist, Iraq.
Celadet Bedir Khan (Celadet Alî Bedirxan), (1893–1951), linguist, journalist and politician, founder of the Latin-based Kurdish alphabet.
Nuri Barzinji (1896–1958), poet, Iraqi Kurdistan.
Arab Shamilov (Erebê Şemo) (1897–1978), writer and novelist, Armenia.
Rafiq Hilmi (1898–1960), writer, literary analyst and politician, Iraq.
Muhammad Wali Kermashani (1901-?), poet, Iran
Cigerxwîn (Cegerxwîn), (1903–1984), poet and writer, Turkey/Syria.
Abdulla Goran (1904–1962), poet and father of modern Kurdish poetry, Iraqi Kurdistan.

Osman Sabri (1905–1993), poet, writer and journalist, Turkey/Syria.
Emînê Evdal (1906–1964), writer and linguist, Armenia.
Alaaddin Sajadi (1907–1984), writer, poet and academic, Iraqi Kurdistan.
Hecîyê Cindî (1908–1990), writer, linguist and researcher, Armenia.
Qanate Kurdo (1909–1985), writer, linguist and academic, Russia.
Qedrîcan (1911–1972), poet and writer, Turkey/Syria.
Ibrahim Ahmad (1914–2000), writer, novelist and translator, Iraqi Kurdistan/England.
Dildar, (Yonis Reuf), (1917–1948), poet, Iraq
Nûredin Zaza (1919-1988), writer, publisher,  Turkey and Syria, Switzerland.
Hejar (Abdurrahman Sharafkandi), (1920–1990), poet, writer, translator and linguist, Iran.
Hemin Mukriyani (Hêmin Mukriyanî), (1921–1986), journalist and poet, Iran.
Ahmad Hardi (1922–2006), poet, Iraqi Kurdistan/UK.
Karim Hisami (1926–2001), writer, Iran/Iraq/Sweden.
Muhamad Salih Dilan (1927–1990), One of the founders of modern Kurdish poetry.
Shamil Asgarov (1928–2005), poet, researcher on the history and culture of the Kurds in Azerbaijan, translator.
Emerîkê Serdar (1935-2018), journalist, writer and translator, Armenia.
Mahmud Baksi (1944–2001), writer and journalist, Sweden.
Abdulla Pashew (1946- ), contemporary poet, Iraqi Kurdistan/Sweden
Shami Kermashani (1927-1984), poet from southeastern Kurdistan, Iran.
Faryad Shiri (1971- ), poet from southeastern Kurdistan, Iran.
Malak Jân Nemati (1906-1993), mystical writer and poet from southeastern Kurdistan, Iran.
Khider Kosari (1969–1993) Islamist poet from Ranya, Kurdistan.

21st century
Bachtyar Ali, (1960), Kurdish writer and poet

Sara Omar, (1986-), Contemporary author, novelist, poet human rights fighter, first internationally recognized Kurdish female novelist from Kurdistan
Abdullah Öcalan
Selahattin Demirtaş

See also 
 List of Kurdish scholars

References

Kurdish literature
Kurdish poets
Kurdish writers
Kurdish people by occupation
Lists of poets by language